The Rodewald Concert Society is a promoter of chamber music in the Liverpool and Merseyside area of England.  It was established in 1911 as the Rodewald Concert Club, in memory of Alfred Edward Rodewald (1862–1903), a well-respected amateur conductor in Liverpool, and close friend of Edward Elgar who dedicated the first of his Pomp and Circumstance Marches to Rodewald. It changed its name to the Rodewald Concert Society in 1916. Its founding Secretary was H Ernest Roberts and its presidents have included Sir Charles Villiers Stanford, Sir Thomas Beecham, Sir Adrian Boult, Walter Weller and John McCabe (composer). Concert venues have varied over the years and have included the Carlton Restaurant (now Garlands Night Club), the Yamen Café in Bold Street (now The Leaf), the Concert Hall in India Buildings, the Adelphi Hotel and the Philharmonic Hall.   In 1936, The Liverpool Music Society amalgamated with the Rodewald Concert Society.

At first, concerts were given by local musicians, usually the Rawdon Briggs Quartet who were succeeded by the Catterall Quartet.  For many years now, the society has brought some of the finest chamber music ensembles to Liverpool, including string quartets such as the Hungarian Quartet, Carmirelli Quartet, Amadeus Quartet, the Smetana Quartet, the Janáček Quartet and the Melos Quartet, and other chamber groups such as the Beaux Arts Trio. More recently, the Skampa Quartet, the Belcea Quartet and the Florestan Trio have visited the society. Recent seasons have offered audiences quality series of quartet concerts, lieder and piano recitals by Stephen Hough, Paul Lewis, Nikolai Demidenko and Llr Williams.  Joglaresa have also performed, a concert highly appreciated by followers of early music.

The society has also a record of commissioning new works, including works by Judith Weir, in partnership with the South East Arts Association, to celebrate the 150th Anniversary of the RLPS and the Endellion Quartet as Quartet-in-Residence for the South East Arts Association, Hugh Wood, to celebrate Liverpool as European Capital of Culture in 2008, and John McCabe, its President. A commission in 2012 was for a clarinet quintet by Emily Howard, performed by Nicholas Cox and the Danel Quartet (Quatuor Danel).  Wirral composer Emily Howard has been one of the real discoveries of recent seasons and this new work was received with great acclaim.

The Rodewald Concert Society went through some financial difficulties during the 1990s, but the present chairman, committee and members of the public re-established it, allowing it to resume its activities.  The society relaunched its programme with the Beethoven Series Quartets Concerts and the Endellion Quartet in 2000.

While it is an independent charity, the society enjoyed a close working relationship with the Royal Liverpool Philharmonic Society, with whom it played a major role in completing the provision of a full range of classical musical performances for audiences in the Merseyside area.   In 2012, in its Centenary year, the decision was made by the society to become fully independent and to assume a new role of commissioning new works and sponsorship of the Chamber Concert Series, which are now fully promoted by the Royal Liverpool Philharmonic.  It is now entirely reliant on the support of its members and patrons for its activities.

In its new role, the society promoted, in association with the University of Liverpool and Hope University a concert by the Smith Quartet as part of Liverpool Hope University's Cornerstone Arts
Festival 2012. The Smith Quartet is recognised as being at the leading edge of the new music world.  At this concert, the society jointly promoted the first performances of two new compositions, one by Liverpool Hope University composer Ian Percy and the second by University of Liverpool composer Matthew Fairclough.   Both new works were commissioned by the two universities and combined string quartet with live electronics.

In 2014, the society commissioned a new work for Oboe and String Quartet by Ian Stephens, performed by the Brodsky Quartet with Jonathan Small, oboe, in the Concert Hall, St Georges Hall.  It is hoped that this work will be recorded during 2017–18 for release as a CD and that further performances will take place.

Concerts were for many years held in the Philharmonic Hall, Liverpool, but since 2007 the society held most of its concerts in the newly refurbished Small Concert Hall at St. George's Hall, Liverpool.

The society promoted in 2014, featuring works of the local composer, Ian Stephens as well as well-known items.  The first, held on Monday 18 August 2014, was given by the Ensemble of St Luke's, in conjunction with the Liverpool International Music Festival (LIMF) and included a quartet commissioned by a former treasurer of the society from Ian Stephens.  It took take place at the unusual venue of Leaf on Bold Street. The second promotion, on Sunday 12 October 2014, was a concert by the Brodsky Quartet with Jonathan Small (oboe)  in which a commission of an Oboe Quintet by Ian Stephens received its premier at St George's Hall.   This work was written in memoriam of two of its former committee members, Dr Monica Nurnberg and David Dutch (both amateur oboe players) for their significant contributions to music on Merseyside.

The society under its chairman has developed a forward plan in which it will collaborate closely with the Royal Liverpool Philharmonic Society in sponsorship of an up-and-coming quartet concert.   It is also working closely with The University of Liverpool Music department in sponsorship of school visits to music workshops.

External links 
Official website

1911 establishments in England
Chamber music
Music organisations based in the United Kingdom
Organisations based in Liverpool
Arts organizations established in 1911